Sundakkampalayam is a panchayat village in Gobichettipalayam taluk in Erode District of Tamil Nadu state, India. It is about 26 km from Gobichettipalayam and 44 km from district headquarters Erode. The village is located on the State Highway 81 connecting Gobichettipalayam with Kangeyam. Sundakkampalayam has a population of about 4048.

References

Villages in Namakkal district